Kevin Felida (born 11 November 1999) is a professional footballer who plays for RKC Waalwijk, as a midfielder. Born in the Netherlands, he represents the Curaçao national team.

Club career
Born in Spijkenisse, where he grew up as a childhood friend of Joshua Zirkzee, Felida ended up in the youth academy of FC Den Bosch via VV Spijkenisse and Excelsior. In the 2017–18 season, he began playing for their under-21 team. Felida made his senior debut on 1 December 2017, in the 3–0 win over Go Ahead Eagles, where he came on as a substitute in the 85th minute for Muhammed Mert. On 14 November, it was announced that Felida has signed a contract extension keeping him at the club until the summer of 2020. At the same time, Felida became a regular part of the first-team squad. In the match against FC Dordrecht (4–1 win), on 16 March 2018, Felida scored his first professional goal, a strike from 30 metres out.

In the summer of 2022, Felida joined RKC Waalwijk on a three-year contract.

International career
Felida debuted with the Curaçao national team in a 0–0 2022 FIFA World Cup qualification tie with Guatemala on 8 June 2021.

Personal life
Born in the Netherlands, Felida is of Curaçaoan descent. He is the nephew of the footballer Charlison Benschop.

References

1999 births
Living people
Association football midfielders
Curaçao footballers
Curaçao international footballers
Dutch footballers
Dutch people of Curaçao descent
FC Den Bosch players
RKC Waalwijk players
Eerste Divisie players
People from Spijkenisse
VV Spijkenisse players
Footballers from South Holland